Juncus howellii is a species of rush known by the common name Howell's rush. It is native to the northwestern United States, where it grows in moist mountain meadows. This is a perennial herb growing from a thick rhizome and producing stems up to about 60 centimeters tall. The inflorescence is a series of clusters of small flowers, each flower with brown or green pointed segments a few millimeters long.

External links
Jepson Manual Treatment
Calflora
Photo gallery

howellii
Plants described in 1949
Flora of the Western United States
Flora without expected TNC conservation status